Hanley Park is an urban park in Stoke-on-Trent, England. The park was developed by the town of Hanley over a period of five years and cost approximately £70,000. It has been described as a good example of a late Victorian municipal park, and is listed Grade II* in Historic England's Register of Parks and Gardens.

Site
The area previously comprised a large waste ground called 'Stoke Fields', cut in two by the Caldon Canal. The land was purchased from the estate of Shelton Hall which stood a third of a mile to the north between Cemetery Road and Caledonian Road, and is now substantially outside the area of Hanley Park.

Design of the park
The park was developed under the supervision of the landscape architect Thomas Hayton Mawson of Windermere, who created Burslem Park around the same time.  Mawson's design makes use of terracotta to highlight features such as the axis between one of two footbridges across the canal and the pavilion.  The pavilion, which is arguably the park's main focal point, was completed in 1896, and was designed by Mawson's junior partner Dan Gibson. The bandstand between the pavilion and the canal was the gift of Mr George Howson, a local pottery owner. 

The southwest end of the park consists of a lake which is fed from the canal. Fishing is permitted. Next to the lake is a word sculpture that reads  and 

Other facilities in the park include a basketball court, a football court and four children's play areas. At the western end of Hanley Park, adjacent to Stoke-on-Trent College, previously known as Cauldon College, there is the small  Cauldon Park.

The Hanley Park Fete was held from 1897 to 1939 and featured a funfair, side shows and a display of fireworks. The Potteries Central Horse Parade (open to anyone living within 10 miles of Hanley Town Hall) was also held annually (but it was never resumed after World War II).

Restoration
In June 2015, it was announced that a £4.5 million Heritage Lottery Fund grant had been secured, which would allow for the restoration of the pavilion, boathouse, canal bridges, lake and fountains.

Hanley parkrun
Hanley Park hosts a free, weekly, timed 5km parkrun every Saturday at 9 a.m. The first Hanley parkrun took place in September 2011.

References

External links

Gardens by Thomas Hayton Mawson
Grade II* listed parks and gardens in Staffordshire
Parks and open spaces in Staffordshire
Pedestrian bridges in parks and gardens
1896 establishments in England
Areas of Stoke-on-Trent
Tourist attractions in Stoke-on-Trent